Madeleine Simms (née Zimmermann: 6 September 1930 – 3 October 2011) was an Austrian-born British social campaigner and one of the architects of the Abortion Act 1967.

Personal life
She was born Madeleine Zimmerman in Vienna to a Jewish family and they moved to London where she was educated at St Paul's Girls' School (at the same time as Shirley Williams) and then read Moral Philosophy and English Literature at Aberdeen University. She married Dennis Simms in 1956, whom she met through the Jewish Graduates Association. They had two children together: Nick (born 1959) and Harriet (born 1965).

As a campaigner
After the birth of her first child (Nick) in 1959, Simms discovered abortion was illegal in the UK. She joined the Abortion Law Reform Association, becoming press officer and editor of the newsletter, and worked on what would become the 1967 Abortion Act with Liberal MP David Steel. While this was less radical than she liked, she pragmatically considered it a good start.

She was latterly a trustee of various population and birth control trusts, including the Birth Control Trust, the Simon Population Trust and the Galton Institute. She was also the deputy director of the Institute for Social Studies in Medical Care, London. For a period, she was seconded to the Department of Health research management division, writing articles, pamphlets and reports.

See also
 Abortion in the United Kingdom

Selected bibliography
Abortion Law Reformed (1971), with Keith Hindell
Non-medical Abortion Counselling (1973)
Teenage Mothers and Their Partners (1991)

References

External links
"Obituary: Madeleine Simms", by Geoffrey Vevers, The Galton Institute Newsletter, #79, Winter 2012
"Madeleine Simms obituary", by Suzie Hayman, The Guardian, 12 October 2011
"Obituary: Madeleine Simms", The Times, 10 October 2011

1930 births
2011 deaths
Alumni of the University of Aberdeen
Alumni of Bedford College, London
Birth control activists
English humanists
English atheists
British abortion-rights activists
Austrian Jews
People from Vienna
English people of Austrian-Jewish descent